The 2012 FIFA Club World Cup final was the final match of the 2012 FIFA Club World Cup, an association football tournament hosted by Japan. It was the ninth final of the FIFA Club World Cup, a FIFA-organised tournament between the winners of the six continental confederations as well as the host nation's league champions.

The final was contested between CONMEBOL winners Corinthians and UEFA winners Chelsea, and took place at the International Stadium Yokohama in Yokohama on 16 December 2012. Corinthians defeated Chelsea 1–0 after a header from Paolo Guerrero, which meant Corinthians won their second FIFA Club World Cup, then known as FIFA Club World Championship, twelve years after winning their first in 2000. The match kicked-off at 19:30 JST and was officiated by Turkish referee Cüneyt Çakır.

Both clubs entered the competition after winning their respective club football competitions. Corinthians won the 2012 Copa Libertadores, following a 2–0 win against Boca Juniors in the final, while Chelsea won the 2011–12 UEFA Champions League, having defeated Bayern Munich 4–3 in a penalty shoot-out, after being held 1–1 in normal time. This was Corinthians's second time competing in the tournament, having won the competition in 2000, following a 4–3 penalty shoot-out win over Vasco da Gama.

Background
The International Stadium Yokohama had hosted the FIFA Club World Cup finals five times, with the 2009 and 2010 finals being held at the Zayed Sports City Stadium in Abu Dhabi, United Arab Emirates. Brazilian sides have been the most dominant side of any other South American teams, with the first dating back in 2000, where Corinthians won the competition for the first time, then known as FIFA Club World Championship, where they beat Vasco da Gama 4–3 in a penalty shoot-out.
This was followed by wins from São Paulo, who beat Liverpool 1–0 and Internacional with the same scoreline against Barcelona. At the time, Manchester United were the only English team to have won the competition, in 2008, when they defeated Ecuadorian side LDU Quito 1–0.

Route to the final
Both clubs received byes from the play-off rounds and the quarter-finals.

Corinthians
Corinthians advanced to the final after a 1–0 win against Al-Ahly on 12 December. Paolo Guerrero scored the winning goal with a header after thirty minutes.

Chelsea
Chelsea took on Monterrey on 13 December, winning 3–1 after goals from Juan Mata, Fernando Torres, and a Dárvin Chávez own goal. Aldo de Nigris scored a consolation goal for Monterrey in stoppage time.

Pre-match

Venue
The International Stadium Yokohama has been the venue for the FIFA Club World Cup since 2005. It was built and opened in 1998, and is the home ground of Yokohama F. Marinos, who plays in the J. League, the highest division of the Japanese league system. The venue has been used five times in the previous FIFA Club World Championship and Club World Cup finals, in 2005, 2006, 2007 and 2008, as well as 2011.

Match ball
The official match ball for the final was the Adidas Cafusa, provided by German sports equipment company Adidas. It was used throughout the tournament and also at the 2013 FIFA Confederations Cup.

Officials
Cüneyt Çakır, representing the Turkish Football Federation and UEFA, was selected as the referee of the final. He was first listed as an international referee in 2006, and had earlier taken charge of his first FIFA Club World Cup match, the first quarter-final match between Ulsan Hyundai and Monterrey on 9 December 2012. Çakır was assisted by Bahattin Duran and Tarık Ongun, while the fourth and fifth officials were Alireza Faghani and Hassan Kamranifar, representing the Football Federation Islamic Republic of Iran and one of the two AFC representatives in the competition, alongside Nawaf Shukralla of the Bahrain Football Association.

Match

Details

Statistics

See also
Chelsea F.C. in international football competitions

References

External links

 FIFA Club World Cup Japan 2012 match center at FIFA.com

World
Final
2012
Sports competitions in Yokohama
Sport Club Corinthians Paulista matches
Chelsea F.C. matches
World
2010s in Yokohama